William Barton Worthington (8 July 1854 – 29 December 1939) was a British civil engineer.

William Worthington was born in Lancaster to Samuel Barton Worthington, a railway engineer. He was educated at Owens College, Manchester, and then at the University of London. Following this he was apprenticed to his father. Upon completion of his apprenticeship he joined Blyth & Cunningham of Edinburgh working on projects for the Caledonian Railway.

In 1876 he became the resident engineer for the London and North Western Railway, working on the construction of Manchester Exchange Station. During this time he worked under the supervision of the Chief Engineer, William Baker. In 1890 he was appointed assistant engineer to the Lancashire and Yorkshire Railway, becoming their chief engineer in 1897. He became chief engineer at Midland Railway in 1905, remaining there until his retirement in 1915.

He then set up practice as a consultant engineer and served as president of the Institution of Civil Engineers between 1921 and 1922.

References 

        
        
        
        
        
        

British civil engineers
1854 births
1939 deaths
Presidents of the Institution of Civil Engineers
Presidents of the Smeatonian Society of Civil Engineers
Alumni of the University of London
People from Lancaster, Lancashire